Metodesnitazene (also known as Metazene) is a benzimidazole derivative with opioid effects, though unlike related compounds such as metonitazene and etodesnitazene which are many times more potent, metodesnitazene is only around the same potency as morphine in animal studies. It was proposed by the DEA to be placed under legal control in the US in December 2021.

See also 
 Etonitazepyne
 Isotonitazene
 List of benzimidazole opioids

References 

Analgesics
Designer drugs
Benzimidazole opioids
Aromatic ethers